Marianna Zachariadi (25 February 1990 – 29 April 2013) was a Greek pole vaulter who later competed for Cyprus.

She won silver in pole vault at the 2009 Mediterranean Games as well as at the 2010 Commonwealth Games. Zachariadi died in 2013, aged 23, of Hodgkin's lymphoma, which had been diagnosed in 2011.

References

1990 births
2013 deaths
Greek female pole vaulters
Cypriot female pole vaulters
Athletes (track and field) at the 2010 Commonwealth Games
Commonwealth Games silver medallists for Cyprus
Commonwealth Games medallists in athletics
Mediterranean Games silver medalists for Cyprus
Athletes (track and field) at the 2009 Mediterranean Games
Mediterranean Games medalists in athletics
Deaths from cancer in Cyprus
Deaths from Hodgkin lymphoma
Place of death missing
Medallists at the 2010 Commonwealth Games